The European Tour 2014/2015 – Event 3 (also known as the 2014 Victoria Bulgarian Open) was a professional minor-ranking snooker tournament that took place between 1–5 October 2014 in Sofia, Bulgaria.

The tournament was meant to be Ali Carter's first since his lung cancer diagnosis and subsequent chemotherapy treatment, but he was forced to withdraw due to acute pain in his left arm following his radiofrequency ablation surgery.

John Higgins was the defending champion, but he lost 1–4 against Judd Trump in the last 64.

Shaun Murphy won his fifteenth professional title by defeating Martin Gould 4–2 in the final.

Prize fund 
The breakdown of prize money of the event is shown below:

Main draw

Preliminary rounds

Round 1 
Best of 7 frames

Round 2 
Best of 7 frames

Round 3 
Best of 7 frames

Main rounds

Top half

Section 1

Section 2

Section 3

Section 4

Bottom half

Section 5

Section 6

Section 7

Section 8

Finals

Century breaks 

 139  Dominic Dale
 138, 108  Fraser Patrick
 135  Ryan Day
 135  Michael White
 133, 108  Michael Wasley
 133, 106  Neil Robertson
 133  Liang Wenbo
 132, 131, 111, 110, 108  Mark Selby
 128, 118  Ricky Walden
 127, 117, 105  Judd Trump
 125  Oliver Lines
 123  Matthew Selt
 123  Xiao Guodong
 122  Gerard Greene
 121, 109  Peter Ebdon
 119  Jamie Cope
 115, 111, 102  Shaun Murphy
 114  Gareth Allen

 110  Mark Davis
 110  John Higgins
 109  Kurt Maflin
 107, 101  Martin Gould
 107  Robbie Williams
 106  Anthony McGill
 106  Andrew Higginson
 105  Barry Pinches
 104  Mark Joyce
 104  Liam Highfield
 104  Robert Milkins
 104  Ben Woollaston
 103  Tom Ford
 103  Fergal O'Brien
 101  Joe Perry
 100  Gary Wilson
 100  Jimmy White
 100  Jeff Cundy

References 

2014
ET3
2014 in Bulgarian sport